Khuda or Khoda is the Persian word for "Lord" or "God". Originally, it was used in reference to Ahura Mazda (the name of the God in Zoroastrianism). Iranian languages, Turkic languages, and many Indo-Aryan languages employ the word. Today, it is a word that is largely used in the non-Arabic Islamic world, with wide usage from its native country Iran, Turkey, Afghanistan, Azerbaijan, Bangladesh, Kazakhstan, Pakistan, Tajikistan, Turkmenistan, Uzbekistan, and some Muslim-majority areas of India, as well as southern and southwestern Russia.

Etymology 

The term derives from Middle Iranian terms xvatay, xwadag meaning "lord", "ruler", "master", appearing in written form in Parthian kwdy, in Middle Persian kwdy, and in Sogdian kwdy.  It is the Middle Persian reflex of older Iranian forms such as  Avestan xva-dhata- "self-defined; autocrat", an epithet of Ahura Mazda. The Pashto term Xdāi (خدۍ) is a variant of this.

Prosaic usage is found for example in the Sassanid title katak-xvatay to denote the head of a clan or extended household or in the title of the 6th century Khwaday-Namag "Book of Lords", from which the tales of Kayanian dynasty as found in the Shahnameh derive.

Zoroastrian usage 

Semi-religious usage appears, for example, in the epithet zaman-i derang xvatay "time of the long dominion", as found in the Menog-i Khrad. The fourth and eighty-sixth entry of the Pazend prayer titled 101 Names of God, Harvesp-Khoda "Lord of All" and Khudawand "Lord of the Universe", respectively, are compounds involving Khuda.
Application of khuda as  "the Lord" (Ahura Mazda) is represented in the first entry in the medieval Frahang-i Pahlavig.

Islamic usage 

In Islamic times, the term came to be used for God in Islam, paralleling the Arabic name of God Al-Malik "Owner, King, Lord, Master".

The phrase Khuda Hafiz (meaning May God be your Guardian) is a parting phrase commonly used in across the Greater Iran region, in languages including Persian, Pashto and Kurdish. Furthermore, the term is also employed as a parting phrase in many languages across the Indian subcontinent including Urdu, Punjabi, Deccani, Sindhi, Bengali and Kashmiri.

It also exists as a popular loanword, used for God in Turkish (Hüdâ), Bengali (খোদা), Hindi-Urdu (ख़ुदा, خُدا), Kazakh (Xuda/Quda/Qudaı), Uzbek (Xudo), Tatar (Ходай'') and other Indo-Aryan languages and Turkic languages.

Christian usage 
In the Indian subcontinent, Christians who speak Hindi-Urdu translate the word "God" as "Khuda" (ख़ुदा, خُدا), though His personal name is rendered as "Yahovah" (यहोवा, یہوّاہ) or "Yahvah" (यहवा, یہوہ). Bible translations into Hindi and Urdu use these terms.

See also 

 Names of God
 The Lord

References 

Names of God in Islam
Names of God in Zoroastrianism

ur:خدا